The 2015 UEC European Track Championships (under-23 & junior) were the 15th continental championships for European under-23 and junior track cyclists, and the 6th since the event was renamed following the reorganisation of European track cycling in 2010. The event took place at the Athens Olympic Velodrome in Athens, Greece from 14 to 19 July 2015.

Medal summary

Under 23

Junior

Notes
 In junior competitions, individual pursuits are contested over 3km/2km for men/women respectively.

Medal table

References

External links
 Results at UEC.ch

European Track Championships, 2015
under-23
2015 in Greek sport